Uşakspor was a Turkish football club located in Uşak. They play their home games at 1 Eylül Stadium in Uşak. The club was founded in 1967 and played in Second League between 1967–1968, 1970–1975, 1982–1983, 1987–1988, 2005–2007. It suffered financial problems and the team was relegated to the Third League over two seasons. It finally withdrew after 18 matches and will be played in Amateur League at next season. Uşakspor gave its competitive rights to Uşak Belediyespor (now known as Utaş Uşakspor)<ref>Uşakspor Withdraws from the league - mackolik.com in 2008 and the club finally was dissolved in July 2010.

Participations
TFF First League: 1967–68, 1970–75, 1982–83, 1987–88, 2005–07

TFF Second League: 1968–70, 1975–79, 1984–87, 1988–2005, 2007–08

TFF Third League: 2008–09

Turkish Regional Amateur League: 1979–82, 1983–84, 2009–

References

 
Sport in Uşak
Football clubs in Turkey
Association football clubs established in 1967
Association football clubs disestablished in 2010
1967 establishments in Turkey
2010 disestablishments in Turkey